The 2009 Cincinnati Reds season was the 140th season for the franchise in Major League Baseball, and their 7th at Great American Ball Park in Cincinnati. It involved the Cincinnati Reds attempting to win the NL Central after finishing fifth in the division the previous year. For the second year, the Reds were managed by Dusty Baker. The Reds played their seventh season of home games in Great American Ball Park.  The Reds finished the 2009 season 78-84, only four wins more than the 2008 season.

Regular season

Standings

Record vs. opponents

Game log 

|- bgcolor="ffbbbb"
|- align="center" bgcolor="ffbbbb"
| 1 || April 6 || Mets || 2–1 || Santana (1–0) || Harang (0–1) || Rodríguez (1) || 42,177 || 0–1
|- align="center" bgcolor="ffbbbb"
| 2 || April 8 || Mets || 9–7 || Pelfrey (1–0) || Vólquez (0–1) || Rodríguez (2) || 13,568 || 0–2
|- align="center" bgcolor="bbffbb"
| 3 || April 9 || Mets || 8–6 || Arroyo (1–0) || Pérez (0–1) || Cordero (1) || 17,837 || 1–2
|- align="center" bgcolor="bbbbbb"
| || April 10 || Pirates || colspan=6 |Postponed. Rescheduled for August 31
|- align="center" bgcolor="ffbbbb"
| 4 || April 11 || Pirates || 10–2 || Maholm (1–0) || Cueto (0–1) || || 22,276 || 1–3
|- align="center" bgcolor="bbffbb"
| 5 || April 12 || Pirates || 2–0 || Harang (1–1) || Snell (0–2) || || 12,876 || 2–3
|- align="center" bgcolor="bbffbb"
| 6 || April 13 || @ Brewers || 7–6 || Vólquez (1–1) || Gallardo (1–1) || Cordero (2) || 25,016 || 3–3
|- align="center" bgcolor="bbffbb"
| 7 || April 14 || @ Brewers || 6–1 || Arroyo (2–0) || Parra (0–2) || || 27,441 || 4–3
|- align="center" bgcolor="ffbbbb"
| 8 || April 15 || @ Brewers || 9–3 || Looper (1–0) || Owings (0–1) || || 30,349 || 4–4
|- align="center" bgcolor="bbffbb"
| 9 || April 17 || @ Astros || 2–1 || Masset (1–0) || Valverde (0–1) || Cordero (3) || 32,268 || 5–4
|- align="center" bgcolor="ffbbbb"
| 10 || April 18 || @ Astros || 7–0 || Rodríguez (1–1) || Harang (1–2) || || 30,141 || 5–5
|- align="center" bgcolor="bbffbb"
| 11 || April 19 || @ Astros || 4–2 || Vólquez (2–1) || Geary (0–1) || Cordero (4) || 29,372 || 6–5
|- align="center" bgcolor="bbffbb"
| 12 || April 20 || @ Astros || 4–3 || Arroyo (3–0) || Geary (0–2) || Cordero (5) || 23,308 || 7–5
|- align="center" bgcolor="ffbbbb"
| 13 || April 21 || @ Cubs || 7–2 || Harden (1–1) || Owings (0–2) || || 38,403 || 7–6
|- align="center" bgcolor="bbffbb"
| 14 || April 22 || @ Cubs || 3–0 || Cueto (1–1) || Lilly (2–1) || Cordero (6) || 38,738 || 8–6
|- align="center" bgcolor="bbffbb"
| 15 || April 23 || @ Cubs || 7–1 || Harang (2–2) || Zambrano (1–1) || || 40,039 || 9–6
|- align="center" bgcolor="ffbbbb"
| 16 || April 24 || Braves || 4–3 || Vázquez (2–1) || Vólquez (2–2) || González (2) || 30,060 || 9–7
|- align="center" bgcolor="ffbbbb"
| 17 || April 25 || Braves || 10–2 || Lowe (2–1) || Arroyo (3–1) || || 33,015 || 9–8
|- align="center" bgcolor="bbffbb"
| 18 || April 26 || Braves || 8–2 || Owings (1–2) || Kawakami (1–3) || || 29,327 || 10–8
|- align="center" bgcolor="ffbbbb"
| 19 || April 27 || Astros || 4–1 || Sampson (2–0) || Cordero (0–1) || || 12,365 || 10–9
|- align="center" bgcolor="ffbbbb"
| 20 || April 28 || Astros || 8–3 || Rodríguez (2–2) || Harang (2–3) || || 9,878 || 10–10
|- align="center" bgcolor="bbffbb"
| 21 || April 29 || Astros || 3–0 || Vólquez (3–2) || Paulino (0–2) || Cordero (7) || 12,681 || 11–10
|-

|- bgcolor="ffbbbb"
|- align="center" bgcolor="bbffbb"
| 22 || May 1 || @ Pirates || 4–0 || Arroyo (4–1) || Duke (3–2) || || 14,238 || 12–10
|- align="center" bgcolor="ffbbbb"
| 23 || May 2 || @ Pirates || 8–6 || Ohlendorf (3–2) || Owings (1–3) || || 22,891 || 12–11
|- align="center" bgcolor="bbffbb"
| 24 || May 3 || @ Pirates || 5–0 || Cueto (2–1) || Karstens (1–1) || || 13,670 || 13–11
|- align="center" bgcolor="ffbbbb"
| 25 || May 4 || @ Marlins || 3 – 2 (14) || Badenhop (2–1) || Herrera (0–1) || || 10,825 || 13–12
|- align="center" bgcolor="bbffbb"
| 26 || May 5 || @ Marlins || 7–0 || Vólquez (4–2) || Volstad (2–1) || || 11,087 || 14–12
|- align="center" bgcolor="ffbbbb"
| 27 || May 6 || Brewers || 15–3 || Parra (1–4) || Arroyo (4–2) || || 10,982 || 14–13
|- align="center" bgcolor="bbffbb"
| 28 || May 7 || Brewers || 6–5 || Owings (2–3) || Looper (2–2) || Cordero (8) || 14,724 || 15–13
|- align="center" bgcolor="bbffbb"
| 29 || May 8 || Cardinals || 6–4 || Cueto (3–1) || Piñeiro (4–2) || Cordero (9) || 18,016 || 16–13
|- align="center" bgcolor="bbffbb"
| 30 || May 9 || Cardinals || 8–3 || Harang (3–3) || Lohse (3–2) || || 40,651 || 17–13
|- align="center" bgcolor="ffbbbb"
| 31 || May 10 || Cardinals || 8 – 7 (10) || Franklin (1–0) || Cordero (0–2) || Pérez (1) || 27,664 || 17–14
|- align="center" bgcolor="bbffbb"
| 32 || May 11 || @ Diamondbacks || 13–5 || Arroyo (5–2) || Garland (3–2) || || 17,640 || 18–14
|- align="center" bgcolor="bbffbb"
| 33 || May 12 || @ Diamondbacks || 3–1 || Owings (3–3) || Haren (3–4) || Cordero (10) || 24,835 || 19–14
|- align="center" bgcolor="bbffbb"
| 34 || May 13 || @ Diamondbacks || 10–3 || Cueto (4–1) || Augenstein (0–1) || || 20,443 || 20–14
|- align="center" bgcolor="ffbbbb"
| 35 || May 15 || @ Padres || 5–3 || Correia (1–2) || Harang (3–4) || Bell (9) || 27,021 || 20–15
|- align="center" bgcolor="ffbbbb"
| 36 || May 16 || @ Padres || 6 – 5 (16) || Perdomo (1–0) || Owings (3–4) || || 31,001 || 20–16
|- align="center" bgcolor="ffbbbb"
| 37 || May 17 || @ Padres || 3–1 || Peavy (3–5) || Arroyo (5–3) || || 21,123 || 20–17
|- align="center" bgcolor="ffbbbb"
| 38 || May 19 || Phillies || 4–3 || Hamels (2–2) || Cueto (4–2) || Lidge (8) || 18,449 || 20–18
|- align="center" bgcolor="bbffbb"
| 39 || May 20 || Phillies || 5–1 || Harang (4–4) || Moyer (3–4) || || 15,661 || 21–18
|- align="center" bgcolor="ffbbbb"
| 40 || May 21 || Phillies || 12–5 || Blanton (2–3) || Owings (3–5) || || 25,901 || 21–19
|- align="center" bgcolor="bbffbb"
| 41 || May 22 || Indians || 3–1 || Arroyo (6–3) || Laffey (3–1) || Cordero (11) || 28,019 || 22–19
|- align="center" bgcolor="ffbbbb"
| 42 || May 23 || Indians || 7–6 || Vizcaíno (1–1) || Weathers (0–1) || Wood (7) || 35,821 || 22–20
|- align="center" bgcolor="bbffbb"
| 43 || May 24 || Indians || 4 – 3 (11) || Fisher (1–0) || Vizcaíno (1–2) || || 27,796 || 23–20
|- align="center" bgcolor="bbffbb"
| 44 || May 25 || Astros || 8–5 || Harang (5–4) || Rodríguez (5–3) || Cordero (12) || 17,818 || 24–20
|- align="center" bgcolor="bbffbb"
| 45 || May 26 || Astros || 6–4 || Masset (2–0) || Byrdak (1–1) || Cordero (13) || 15,619 || 25–20
|- align="center" bgcolor="bbffbb"
| 46 || May 27 || Astros || 6–1 || Arroyo (7–3) || Paulino (0–4) || || 17,602 || 26–20
|- align="center" bgcolor="ffbbbb"
| 47 || May 29 || @ Brewers || 3–2 || Looper (5–3) || Cueto (4–3) || Hoffman (12) || 42,186 || 26–21
|- align="center" bgcolor="ffbbbb"
| 48 || May 30 || @ Brewers || 9–5 || McClung (2–1) || Harang (5–5) || || 44,172 || 26–22
|- align="center" bgcolor="ffbbbb"
| 49 || May 31 || @ Brewers || 5–2 || Gallardo (5–2) || Owings (3–6) || Hoffman (13) || 44,594 || 26–23
|-

|- bgcolor="ffbbbb"
|- align="center" bgcolor="bbffbb"
| 50 || June 1 || @ Cardinals || 5–3 || Lincoln (1–0) || Wellemeyer (5–5) || Cordero (14) || 35,815 || 27–23
|- align="center" bgcolor="ffbbbb"
| 51 || June 2 || @ Cardinals || 5–2 || Motte (2–1) || Arroyo (7–4) || Franklin (13) || 35,507 || 27–24
|- align="center" bgcolor="bbffbb"
| 52 || June 3 || @ Cardinals || 9–3 || Cueto (5–3) || Lohse (4–4) || || 35,811 || 28–24
|- align="center" bgcolor="ffbbbb"
| 53 || June 4 || @ Cardinals || 3–1 || Carpenter (4–0) || Harang (5–6) || || 39,249 || 28–25
|- align="center" bgcolor="ffbbbb"
| 54 || June 5 || Cubs || 2–1 || Zambrano (4–2) || Owings (3–7) || Gregg (10) || 32,374 || 28–26
|- align="center" bgcolor="bbffbb"
| 55 || June 6 || Cubs || 4 – 3 (11) || Masset (3–0) || Marshall (3–5) || || 40,914 || 29–26
|- align="center" bgcolor="ffbbbb"
| 56 || June 7 || Cubs || 6 – 3 (14) || Patton (2–1) || Lincoln (1–1) || Guzmán (1) || 32,629 || 29–27
|- align="center" bgcolor="bbffbb"
| 57 || June 9 || @ Nationals || 3–2 || Cueto (6–3) || Detwiler (0–3) || Cordero (15) || 16,274 || 30–27
|- align="center" bgcolor="bbffbb"
| 58 || June 10 || @ Nationals || 4 – 2 (12) || Masset (4–0) || Villone (3–1) || Weathers (1) || 19,790 || 31–27
|- align="center" bgcolor="ffbbbb"
| 59 || June 11 || @ Nationals || 3–2 || Tavárez (2–4) || Herrera (0–2) || Beimel (1) || 19,703 || 31–28
|- align="center" bgcolor="ffbbbb"
| 60 || June 12 || @ Royals || 4–1 || Hochevar (2–2) || Maloney (0–1) || || 32,959 || 31–29
|- align="center" bgcolor="ffbbbb"
| 61 || June 13 || @ Royals || 7–4 || Davies (3–6) || Arroyo (7–5) || || 29,574 || 31–30
|- align="center" bgcolor="ffbbbb"
| 62 || June 14 || @ Royals || 7–1 || Bannister (5–3) || Cueto (6–4) || || 24,525 || 31–31
|- align="center" bgcolor="bbffbb"
| 63 || June 16 || Braves || 7–2 || Herrera (1–2) || Jurrjens (5–5) || || 19,127 || 32–31
|- align="center" bgcolor="bbffbb"
| 64 || June 17 || Braves || 4–3 || Owings (4–7) || Vázquez (4–6) || Cordero (16) || 27,455 || 33–31
|- align="center" bgcolor="ffbbbb"
| 65 || June 18 || Braves || 7–0 || Hanson (2–0) || Maloney (0–2) || || 24,657 || 33–32
|- align="center" bgcolor="bbffbb"
| 66 || June 19 || White Sox || 4–3 || Arroyo (8–5) || Contreras (2–6) || Cordero (17) || 28,395 || 34–32
|- align="center" bgcolor="ffbbbb"
| 67 || June 20 || White Sox || 10–8 || Carrasco (2–0) || Herrera (1–3) || Jenks (16) || 42,234 || 34–33
|- align="center" bgcolor="ffbbbb"
| 68 || June 21 || White Sox || 4–1 || Buehrle (7–2) || Harang (5–7) || Jenks (17) || 32,786 || 34–34
|- align="center" bgcolor="ffbbbb"
| 69 || June 23 || @ Blue Jays || 7–5 || Tallet (5–4) || Owings (4–8) || Frasor (2) || 30,351 || 34–35
|- align="center" bgcolor="ffbbbb"
| 70 || June 24 || @ Blue Jays || 8–2 || Richmond (6–4) || Arroyo (8–6) || || 15,409 || 34–36
|- align="center" bgcolor="bbffbb"
| 71 || June 25 || @ Blue Jays || 7–5 || Cueto (7–4) || Camp (0–3) || Cordero (18) || 15,329 || 35–36
|- align="center" bgcolor="ffbbbb"
| 72 || June 26 || @ Indians || 9–2 || Sowers (2–5) || Harang (5–8) || || 28,114 || 35–37
|- align="center" bgcolor="bbffbb"
| 73 || June 27 || @ Indians || 7–3 || Bailey (1–0) || Ohka (0–2) || || 28,646 || 36–37
|- align="center" bgcolor="bbffbb"
| 74 || June 28 || @ Indians || 8–1 || Owings (5–8) || Huff (3–3) || || 23,900 || 37–37
|- align="center" bgcolor="ffbbbb"
| 75 || June 30 || Diamondbacks || 6–2 || Haren (7–5) || Arroyo (8–7) || || 22,725 || 37–38
|-

|- bgcolor="ffbbbb"
|- align="center" bgcolor="bbffbb"
| 76 || July 1 || Diamondbacks || 1–0 || Cueto (8–4) || Garland (4–8) || Cordero (19) || 20,374 || 38–38
|- align="center" bgcolor="bbffbb"
| 77 || July 2 || Diamondbacks || 3–2 || Cordero (1–2) || Zavada (1–2) || || 19,592 || 39–38
|- align="center" bgcolor="ffbbbb"
| 78 || July 3 || Cardinals || 7–4 || Motte (3–2) || Herrera (1–4) || Franklin (20) || 41,349 || 39–39
|- align="center" bgcolor="bbffbb"
| 79 || July 4 || Cardinals || 5–2 || Owings (6–8) || Thompson (2–5) || Cordero (20) || 37,371 || 40–39
|- align="center" bgcolor="ffbbbb"
| 80 || July 5 || Cardinals || 10–1 || Carpenter (6–3) || Arroyo (8–8) || || 24,017 || 40–40
|- align="center" bgcolor="ffbbbb"
| 81 || July 6 || @ Phillies || 22–1 || Hamels (5–5) || Cueto (8–5) || || 41,548 || 40–41
|- align="center" bgcolor="bbffbb"
| 82 || July 7 || @ Phillies || 4–3 || Weathers (1–1) || Lidge (0–4) || Cordero (21) || 43,623 || 41–41
|- align="center" bgcolor="ffbbbb"
| 83 || July 8 || @ Phillies || 3–2 || Madson (3–4) || Weathers (1–2) || || 44,179 || 41–42
|- align="center" bgcolor="ffbbbb"
| 84 || July 9 || @ Phillies || 9–6 || Moyer (8–6) || Owings (6–9) || Lidge (17) || 45,146 || 41–43
|- align="center" bgcolor="bbffbb"
| 85 || July 10 || @ Mets || 3–0 || Arroyo (9–8) || Nieve (3–3) || || 39,203 || 42–43
|- align="center" bgcolor="ffbbbb"
| 86 || July 11 || @ Mets || 4–0 || Santana(10–7) || Cueto (8–6) || || 39,396 || 42–43
|- align="center" bgcolor="ffbbbb"
| 87 || July 12 || @ Mets || 9–7 || Pelfrey (7–4) || Harang (5–9) || || 40,014 || 42–44
|- align="center" bgcolor="ffbbbb"
| 88 || July 16 || Brewers || 9–6 || Looper (8–4) || Bailey (1–1) || Hoffman (21) || 23,279 || 42–45
|- align="center" bgcolor="bbffbb"
| 89 || July 17 || Brewers || 4–0 || Arroyo (10–8) || Suppan (5–7) || || 25,687 || 43–45
|- align="center" bgcolor="ffbbbb"
| 90 || July 18 || Brewers || 5–1 || Parra (4–8) || Harang (5–10) || || 40,524 || 43–46
|- align="center" bgcolor="bbffbb"
| 91 || July 19 || Brewers || 5–3 || Weathers (2–2) || McClung (3–3) || Cordero (22) || 24,924 || 44–46
|- align="center" bgcolor="ffbbbb"
| 92 || July 20 || @ Dodgers || 7–5 || Schmidt (1–0) || Owings (6–10) || Broxton (23) || 43,110 || 44–47
|- align="center" bgcolor="ffbbbb"
| 93 || July 21 || @ Dodgers || 12–3 || Wolf (5–4) || Bailey (1–2) || || 49,027 || 44–48
|- align="center" bgcolor="ffbbbb"
| 94 || July 22 || @ Dodgers || 6–2 || Billingsley (10–5) || Arroyo (10–9) || || 56,000 || 44–49
|- align="center" bgcolor="ffbbbb"
| 95 || July 24 || @ Cubs || 8–5 || Wells (6–4) || Harang (5–11) || || 41,406 || 44–50
|- align="center" bgcolor="ffbbbb"
| 96 || July 25 || @ Cubs || 5–3 || Hart (2–1) || Cueto (8–7) || Gregg (20) || 41,264 || 44–51
|- align="center" bgcolor="ffbbbb"
| 97 || July 26 || @ Cubs || 5–2 || Harden (7–6) || Owings (6–11)|| Gregg (21) || 41,528 || 44–52
|- align="center" bgcolor="bbffbb"
| 98 || July 27 || Padres || 6–4 || Bailey (2–2) || Geer (1–7) || Cordero (23) || 18,563 || 45–52
|- align="center" bgcolor="ffbbbb"
| 99 || July 28 || Padres || 3–2 || Correia (7–8) || Arroyo (10–10) || Bell (23) || 14,526 || 45–53
|- align="center" bgcolor="ffbbbb"
| 100 || July 29 || Padres || 7–1 || Latos (2–1) || Harang (5–12) || || 17,201 || 45–54
|- align="center" bgcolor="ffbbbb"
| 101 || July 30 || Padres || 7–4 || Stauffer (1–2) || Cueto (8–8) || || 19,177 || 45–55
|- align="center" bgcolor="ffbbbb"
| 102 || July 31 || Rockies || 5–3 || Morales (2–0) || Weathers (2–3) || Street (27) || 22,130 || 45–56
|-

|- bgcolor="ffbbbb"
|- align="center" bgcolor="ffbbbb"
| 103 || August 1 || Rockies || 6–2 || Jiménez (8–9) || Bailey (2–3) || || 23,452 || 45–57
|- align="center" bgcolor="ffbbbb"
| 104 || August 2 || Rockies || 6 – 4 (11) || Morales (3–0) || Masset (4–1) || Street (28) || 31,142 || 45–58
|- align="center" bgcolor="ffbbbb"
| 105 || August 3 || Cubs || 4–2 || Wells (8–4) || Harang (5–13) || Mármol (4) || 22,222 || 45–59
|- align="center" bgcolor="ffbbbb"
| 106 || August 4 || Cubs || 6–3 || Gorzelanny (4–1) || Cueto (8–9) || || 17,992 || 45–60
|- align="center" bgcolor="bbffbb"
| 107 || August 5 || Cubs || 4–0 || Lehr (1–0) || Harden (7–7) || || 22,098 || 46–60
|- align="center" bgcolor="bbffbb"
| 108 || August 7 || @ Giants || 10–5 || Weathers (3–3) || Wilson (3–5) || || 41,744 || 47–60
|- align="center" bgcolor="ffbbbb"
| 109 || August 8 || @ Giants || 4–2 || Zito (8–10) || Arroyo (10–11) || Wilson (28) || 37,057 || 47–61
|- align="center" bgcolor="bbffbb"
| 110 || August 9 || @ Giants || 5–2 || Harang (6–13) || Cain (12–4) || Cueto (1)|| 36,705 || 48–62
|- align="center" bgcolor="ffbbbb"
| 111 || August 10 || @ Cardinals || 4–1 || Lohse (5–7) || Wells (0–3) || Franklin (27) || 40,212 || 48–63
|- align="center" bgcolor="bbffbb"
| 112 || August 11 || @ Cardinals || 5–4 || Lehr (2–0) || Boggs (1–1) || Cordero (25) || 40,145 || 49–63
|- align="center" bgcolor="ffbbbb"
| 113 || August 12 || @ Cardinals || 5–2 || Carpenter (12–3) || Bailey (2–4) || Franklin (28) || 40,328 || 49–64
|- align="center" bgcolor="bbffbb"
| 114 || August 13 || Nationals || 7–0 || Arroyo (11–11) || Balester (1–2) || || 16,889 || 50–64
|- align="center" bgcolor="ffbbbb"
| 115 || August 14 || Nationals || 2–0 || Mock (2–4) || Harang (6–14) || MacDougal (12) || 19,606 || 50–65
|- align="center" bgcolor="ffbbbb"
| 116 || August 15 || Nationals || 10–6 || Martin (2–2) || Cueto (8–10) || || 30,494 || 50–66
|- align="center" bgcolor="ffbbbb"
| 117 || August 16 || Nationals || 5–4 || Sosa (2–1) || Rhodes (0–1) || MacDougal (13) || 18,030 || 50–67
|- align="center" bgcolor="ffbbbb"
| 118 || August 18 || Giants || 8 – 5 (10) || Howry (1–5) || Cordero (1–3) || Wilson (29) || 13,334 || 50–68
|- align="center" bgcolor="ffbbbb"
| 119 || August 19 || Giants || 1–0 || Romo (4–2) || Arroyo (11–12) || Wilson (30) || 11,302 || 50–69
|- align="center" bgcolor="bbffbb"
| 120 || August 20 || Giants || 2 – 1 (10) || Cordero (2–3) || Howry (1–6) || || 13,390 || 51–69
|- align="center" bgcolor="ffbbbb"
| 121 || August 21 || @ Pirates || 5–2 || Morton (3–6) || Owings (6–12) || Capps (23) || 22,725 || 51–70
|- align="center" bgcolor="ffbbbb"
| 122 || August 22 || @ Pirates || 12–2 || Duke (10–11) || Lehr (2–1) || || 32,570 || 51–71
|- align="center" bgcolor="bbffbb"
| 123 || August 23 || @ Pirates || 4–1 || Bailey (3–4) || Hart (4–3) || Cordero (26) || 21,209 || 52–71
|- align="center" bgcolor="bbffbb"
| 124 || August 25 || @ Brewers || 8–6 || Herrera (2–4) || Coffey (4–3) || || 29,481 || 53–71
|- align="center" bgcolor="bbffbb"
| 125 || August 26 || @ Brewers || 4–3 || Herrera (3–4) || Burns (3–5) || Cordero (27) || 35,084 || 54–71
|- align="center" bgcolor="bbffbb"
| 126 || August 27 || @ Brewers || 8–5 || Lehr (3–1) || Bush (3–5) || Cordero (28) || 31,091 || 55–71
|- align="center" bgcolor="bbffbb"
| 127 || August 28 || Dodgers || 4–2 || Bailey (4–4) || Billingsley (12–8) || || 19,258 || 56–71
|- align="center" bgcolor="ffbbbb"
| 128 || August 29 || Dodgers || 11–4 || Weaver (6–4) || Maloney (0–3) || || 25,744 || 56–72
|- align="center" bgcolor="ffbbbb"
| 129 || August 30 || Dodgers || 3 – 2 (12) || McDonald (4–3) || Cordero (2–4) || Broxton (29) || 26,091 || 56–73
|- align="center" bgcolor="bbffbb"
| 130 || August 31 || Pirates || 4–3 || Masset (5–1) || Chavez (0–4) || || 13,051 || 57–73
|- align="center" bgcolor="bbffbb"
| 131 || August 31 || Pirates || 6–3 || Cueto (9–10) || Maholm (7–8) || Cordero (29) || 9,087 || 58–73
|-

|- bgcolor="ffbbbb"
|- align="center" bgcolor="bbffbb"
| 132 || September 1 || Pirates || 11–5 || Lehr (4–1) || Morton (3–7) || Owings (1) || 10,304 || 59–73
|- align="center" bgcolor="bbffbb"
| 133 || September 2 || Pirates || 5–3 || Bailey (5–4) || Duke (10–13) || Cordero (30) || 11,541 || 60–73
|- align="center" bgcolor="bbffbb"
| 134 || September 4 || @ Braves || 3–1 || Arroyo (12–12) || Lowe (13–9) || || 24,219 || 61–73
|- align="center" bgcolor="bbffbb"
| 135 || September 5 || @ Braves || 3–1 || Wells (1–3) || Jurrjens (10–10) || || 29,078 || 62–73
|- align="center" bgcolor="bbffbb"
| 136 || September 6 || @ Braves || 4–2 || Owings (7–12) || Kawakami (7–11) || || 32,397 || 63–73
|- align="center" bgcolor="ffbbbb"
| 137 || September 7 || @ Rockies || 4–3 || Betancourt (3–3) || Fisher (1–1) || Morales (4) || 40,357 || 63–74
|- align="center" bgcolor="ffbbbb"
| 138 || September 8 || @ Rockies || 3–1 || Marquis (15–10) || Maloney (0–4) || Morales (5) || 23,154 || 63–75
|- align="center" bgcolor="ffbbbb"
| 139 || September 9 || @ Rockies || 4–3 || Daley (1–1) || Cordero (2–5) || || 23,721 || 63–76
|- align="center" bgcolor="ffbbbb"
| 140 || September 10 || @ Rockies || 5–1 || Rincón (4–2) || Wells (1–4) || || 24,175 || 63–77
|- align="center" bgcolor="ffbbbb"
| 141 || September 11 || @ Cubs || 6–4 || Stevens (1–0) || Lehr (4–2) || Mármol (12) || 39,881 || 63–78
|- align="center" bgcolor="bbffbb"
| 142 || September 12 || @ Cubs || 7–5 || Rhodes (1–1) || Mármol (2–3) || Cordero (34) || 40,351 || 64–78
|- align="center" bgcolor="ffbbbb"
| 143 || September 13 || @ Cubs || 5–2 || Lilly (12–8) || Bailey (5–5) || || 39,805 || 64–79
|- align="center" bgcolor="bbffbb"
| 144 || September 14 || Astros || 3–1 || Arroyo (13–12) || Rodríguez (13–9) || Cordero (36) || 9,852 || 65–79
|- align="center" bgcolor="bbffbb"
| 145 || September 15 || Astros || 5–4 || Herrera (4–4) || Gervacio (1–1) || Cordero (36) || 11,923 || 66–79
|- align="center" bgcolor="bbffbb"
| 146 || September 16 || Astros || 6–5 || Burton (1–0) || Wright (3–3) || Cordero (37) || 10,662 || 67–79
|- align="center" bgcolor="bbffbb"
| 147 || September 17 || Marlins || 3–2 || Maloney (1–4) || Sánchez (2–7) || Cordero (38) || 9,685 || 68–79
|- align="center" bgcolor="ffbbbb"
| 148 || September 18 || Marlins || 4–3 || Donnelly (3–0) || Cordero (2–6) || Núñez (23) || 15,882 || 68–80
|- align="center" bgcolor="ffbbbb"
| 149 || September 19 || Marlins || 3–2 || Nolasco (12–9) || Arroyo (13–13) || Lindstrom (15) || 17,026 || 68–81
|- align="center" bgcolor="bbffbb"
| 150 || September 20 || Marlins || 8–1 || Wells (8–6) || West (2–4) || || 16,186 || 69–81
|- align="center" bgcolor="bbffbb"
| 151 || September 22 || @ Pirates || 10–4 || Cueto (10–10) || Duke (10–15) || || 16,492 || 70–81
|- align="center" bgcolor="bbffbb"
| 152 || September 23 || @ Pirates || 12–2 || Bailey (6–5) || Hart (4–8) || || 15,980 || 71–81
|- align="center" bgcolor="bbffbb"
| 153 || September 24 || @ Pirates || 4–1 || Arroyo (14–13) || Morton (4–9) || Cordero (39) || 15,892 || 72–81
|- align="center" bgcolor="bbffbb"
| 154 || September 25 || @ Astros || 10–4 || Maloney (2–4) || Moehler (8–11) || || 37,710 || 73–81
|- align="center" bgcolor="bbffbb"
| 155 || September 26 || @ Astros || 10–4 || Lehr (5–2) || Paulino (2–11) || || 39,476 || 74–81
|- align="center" bgcolor="ffbbbb"
| 156 || September 27 || @ Astros || 3–2 || Rodríguez (14–11) || Cueto (10–11) || Valverde (25) || 37,595 || 74–82
|- align="center" bgcolor="bbffbb"
| 157 || September 29 || Cardinals || 7–2 || Bailey (7-5) || Piñeiro (15-12) || || 12,026 || 75–82
|- align="center" bgcolor="bbffbb"
| 158 || September 30 || Cardinals || 6–1 || Arroyo (15-13) || Smoltz (3-8) || || 11,930 || 76–82
|-

|- bgcolor="ffbbbb"
|- align="center" |- align="center" bgcolor="ffbbbb"
| 159 || October 1 || Cardinals || 13–0 || Carpenter (17-4) || Wells (2-5) || || 11,861 || 76–83
|- align="center" bgcolor="ffbbbb"
| 160 || October 2 || Pirates || 3–1 || McCutchen (1-2) || Lehr (5–3) || Capps (27) || 16,288 || 76–84
|- align="center" bgcolor="bbffbb"
| 161 || October 3 || Pirates || 8–4 || Cueto (11–11) || Duke (11–16) || || 24,539 || 77–84
|- align="center" bgcolor="bbffbb"
| 162 || October 4 || Pirates || 6–0 || Bailey (8-5) || Karstens (4–6) || || 20,940 || 78–84
|-

Roster

Player stats

Batting

Starters by position
Note: Pos = Position; G = Games played; AB = At bats; H = Hits; Avg. = Batting average; HR = Home runs; RBI = Runs batted in

Through the end of the 2009 season.

Other batters
Note: G = Games played; AB = At bats; H = Hits; Avg. = Batting average; HR = Home runs; RBI = Runs batted in

Through the end of the 2009 season.

Pitching

Starting pitchers
Note: G = Games pitched; IP = Innings pitched; W = Wins; L = Losses; ERA = Earned run average; SO = Strikeouts; WHIP = (Walks+hits) per inning pitched

Through the end of the 2009 season.

Relief pitchers
Note: G = Games pitched; W = Wins; L = Losses; L = Losses; SV = Saves; IP = Innings pitched; ERA = Earned run average; SO = Strikeouts; WHIP = (Walks+hits) per inning pitched

Through the end of the 2009 season.

Farm system

References

Cincinnati Reds seasons
Cincinnati Reds
Cinc